Maubourguet (Gascon: Mauborguet) is a commune in the Hautes-Pyrénées department in south-western France, in the Occitanie region.

Historically, Maubourguet belonged to the County of Bigorre. The town is situated at the crossing of two major roads, Auch-Pau and Bordeaux-Tarbes.

Geography 

Maubourguet is situated in Occitanie, in the north of the Hautes-Pyrénées department. It is mainly located on the shores of the Adour river.

The town is located 625 km (as the crow flies) southwest of the French capital, Paris, 115 km southwest of the regional capital, Toulouse and 26.2 km north-west of the prefecture of the department, Tarbes.

Communal boundaries 
Maubourguet borders on nine different communes.

To the north: Estirac and Sombrun

To the east: Auriébat, Sauveterre and Lafitole

To the south: Vic-en-Bigorre, Nouilhan and Larreule

To the west: Lahitte-Toupière

Topography and Geology 
Maubourguet is located south of the Aquitaine Basin, a vast sedimentary geological region of the south-west of France, close to the Pyrénées, and in the valley of the Adour, before its bend towards the Atlantic.

The territory of Maubourguet extends over 22.04 km2; its elevation varies between 164 and 285 meters. The highest point of the commune is in the west, on the hills overlooking the plain of the Adour. The minimum elevation is at the level of the Adour when it leaves the territory in the north.

Climate

Maubourguet has a oceanic climate (Köppen climate classification Cfb) closely bordering on a humid subtropical climate (Cfa).

Population

See also
Communes of the Hautes-Pyrénées department

References

External links
Town website
Pays du Val d'Adour website

 

Communes of Hautes-Pyrénées
Hautes-Pyrénées communes articles needing translation from French Wikipedia
Armagnac